Alexandra Hargreaves (born 13 November 1980) is a former Australian rugby union player. She has represented Australia in both fifteens and sevens.

Hargreaves competed for the Wallaroos at the 2002 and 2006 Rugby World Cup's. She was also a member of the squad to the 2010 Rugby World Cup that finished in third place. In 2009, she was part of the Australian women's sevens team that won the Rugby World Cup Sevens in Dubai.

Hargreaves retired in 2012 along with former Wallaroo Debby Hodgkinson. She is the assistant coach for the Sydney Uni Women's Rugby Club.

References

1980 births
Living people
Australia women's international rugby union players
Australian female rugby union players
Australian female rugby sevens players
Sportswomen from New South Wales
Rugby union players from Sydney
Rugby union flankers